1931 Čapek, provisional designation , is a background asteroid from the central regions of the asteroid belt, approximately 7 kilometers in diameter. It was discovered on 22 August 1969, by Czech astronomer Luboš Kohoutek at the Bergedorf Observatory in Hamburg, Germany. The asteroid was named in memory of Czech writer Karel Čapek.

Orbit and classification 

Čapek is a background asteroid, not associated to any known asteroid family. It orbits the Sun in the inner part of the central main-belt near the 3:1 resonance with Jupiter at a distance of 1.9–3.2 AU once every 4 years and 1 month (1,480 days). Its orbit has an eccentricity of 0.27 and an inclination of 8° with respect to the ecliptic.

The body's observation arc begins at Crimea–Nauchnij, eleven days prior to its official discovery observation at Bergedorf.

Physical characteristics

Spectral type 

In the Tholen classification, Čapek is a common carbonaceous C-type asteroid. This strongly disagrees with the albedo obtained by the Wide-field Infrared Survey Explorer (WISE), which indicates that Čapek is a stony S-type asteroid rather than a carbonaceous one.

Rotation period 

As of 2017, no rotational lightcurve of Čapek has been obtained from photometric observations. The asteroid's rotation period, shape and poles remain unknown.

Diameter and albedo 

According to the survey carried out by the NEOWISE mission of NASA's Wide-field Infrared Survey Explorer, Čapek measures 6.628 kilometers in diameter  and its surface has an albedo of 0.254.

Naming 

This minor planet was named in memory of Karel Čapek (1890–1938), Czech dramatist and novelist, best known for his allegorical plays R.U.R. and Krakatit, in which he anticipated both, the destructive potential of nuclear physics and their moral implications. The official naming citation was published by the Minor Planet Center on 27 June 1991.

References

External links 
 Asteroid Lightcurve Database (LCDB), query form (info )
 Dictionary of Minor Planet Names, Google books
 Asteroids and comets rotation curves, CdR – Observatoire de Genève, Raoul Behrend
 Discovery Circumstances: Numbered Minor Planets (1)-(5000) – Minor Planet Center
 
 

001931
Discoveries by Luboš Kohoutek
Named minor planets
001931
19690822